Kimmit Lowell  Harvey (born ) is a Turks and Caicos Islands male weightlifter, competing in the +105 kg category and representing Turks and Caicos Islands at international competitions. He participated at the 2010 Commonwealth Games in the +105 kg event.

Major competitions

References

1973 births
Living people
Turks and Caicos Islands weightlifters
Weightlifters at the 2010 Commonwealth Games
Commonwealth Games competitors for the Turks and Caicos Islands
Place of birth missing (living people)